Miguel Filipe Nunes Cardoso (born 19 June 1994) is a Portuguese professional footballer who plays as a winger for Turkish club Kayserispor.

Club career
Born in São Sebastião da Pedreira, Lisbon, Cardoso finished his development with Real S.C. in 2012, after having represented four other clubs including S.L. Benfica and Casa Pia AC. He made his senior debut on 2 September 2012, coming on as a second-half substitute in a 1–1 fourth division home draw against C.A. Pêro Pinheiro.

Cardoso scored his first goal as a senior on 30 March 2013, the second in the 6–1 home rout of G.D. Peniche. He finished the season with 17 appearances and three goals.

On 29 January 2014, aged 20, Cardoso moved to Spain after signing with Deportivo de La Coruña, being assigned to the reserves in the Tercera División. On 31 March 2015, after scoring a hat-trick in a 5–0 home victory over Silva SD, he signed a professional contract running until 2017, being also promoted to the main squad.

Cardoso played his first game as a professional on 2 December 2015, starting in a 2–1 away win against UE Llagostera in the round of 32 of the Copa del Rey. He first appeared in La Liga ten days later, replacing Juanfran for the last 20 minutes and providing an assist for Lucas Pérez as the visitors came from behind 0–2 at FC Barcelona to draw 2–2.

On 28 January 2016, Cardoso was loaned to C.F. União until June 2017. On 4 July, he cut ties with Dépor and signed for C.D. Tondela just hours later. In his second season at the latter, he scored eight Primeira Liga goals to help to an 11th-place finish, adding six assists.

Cardoso joined Russian Premier League club FC Dynamo Moscow on 31 August 2018, on a four-year contract. In his second game as a starter, on 14 September, he opened the scoring in the fifth minute of an eventual 1–1 away draw with defending champions FC Lokomotiv Moscow.

On 19 February 2020, Cardoso was loaned to FC Tambov of the same country and league until the end of the campaign. In August, he returned to his country after joining Belenenses SAD also in a temporary deal.

Cardoso terminated his contract with Dynamo in August 2021, by mutual consent. Shortly after, he moved to Turkish Süper Lig's Kayserispor.

References

External links

1994 births
Living people
Portuguese footballers
Footballers from Lisbon
Association football wingers
Primeira Liga players
Real S.C. players
C.F. União players
C.D. Tondela players
Belenenses SAD players
La Liga players
Tercera División players
Deportivo Fabril players
Deportivo de La Coruña players
Russian Premier League players
FC Dynamo Moscow players
FC Tambov players
Süper Lig players
Kayserispor footballers
Portuguese expatriate footballers
Expatriate footballers in Spain
Expatriate footballers in Russia
Expatriate footballers in Turkey
Portuguese expatriate sportspeople in Spain
Portuguese expatriate sportspeople in Russia
Portuguese expatriate sportspeople in Turkey